"Strange Attraction" is a single released by the British group the Cure in 1996 on Elektra Records.  The song was initially released on the album Wild Mood Swings, and was released as a single in the United States and Australia.

History
No music video was filmed to promote the single, believed to be because Robert Smith felt the last video for a single release exclusively in the US, "Fascination Street", was not what the band were aiming for. Because of that "Strange Attraction" remains the only The Cure single (not counting original mix of "Boys Don't Cry") without a music video.

Track listing
"Strange Attraction [Adrian Sherwood Album Mix]"
"The 13th" [Feels Good Mix]
"This is a Lie" [Ambient Mix]
"Gone!" [Critter Mix]
"Strange Attraction" [Strange Mix]

Personnel
Robert Smith:  vocals, guitar
Simon Gallup:  bass
Perry Bamonte:  keyboards
Roger O'Donnell:  keyboards
Jason Cooper:  drums

Charts

References

The Cure songs
1996 singles
1996 songs
Songs written by Robert Smith (musician)
Songs written by Jason Cooper
Songs written by Roger O'Donnell
Songs written by Simon Gallup
Songs written by Perry Bamonte
Elektra Records singles